Frank Coburn (1862 – November 13, 1938) was an American painter.

Further reading

References

1862 births
1938 deaths
Artists from Chicago
People from Santa Ana, California
Painters from California
American male painters
20th-century American painters
20th-century American male artists